3rd Avenue is a Filipino band composed of Muriel Dela Paz (lead vocals), Paolo Ledesma (lead vocals), Joy Reyes (lead vocals), Alchris Ramirez (lead vocals), Beng Gatmaitan (drums), Migs Nuñez (keyboards), Gino Madrid (Guitars) and Lester Cerda (Saxophone and Flute).

This band started as an acoustic group of three members in 2000. The original members started performing at restaurants, bars and weddings. Although each one of them had different career backgrounds, they were bound together by their passion and enthusiasm for music.

The group embraced this bond and eventually added members to evolve into a 8-piece group. They released their first album, 3rd Avenue - In Time which was produced by Barnyard Music and distributed by Universal Records in 2007; and became the most sought after group in the Philippine wedding industry. Because of this, they are dubbed as "The Country's Premier Wedding Band".

The members of the group share a common love for music, friendships, and everything worthwhile. They are known for their musical versatility. They cover genres from ballads, pop, jazz, top 40 and more. Although the band is composed of businessmen, bankers, athletes, composers, and more, they are tied together by their musical passion.

Discography

Albums

Singles
"Aking Hiling" from the album In Time (July 2007) theme song for QTV-11's Asianovela Sunrise and featured in GMA 7's Daisy Siete Season 16: Tabaching-ching
"Why Can't It Be" from the album In Time (November 2007) OST for GMA Films' My Bestfriend's Girlfriend (BFGF), also featured in GMA 7's Maynila (2007)
"Hangga't Tayo'y Magkasama" from the album In Time (April 2008) and featured in GMA 7's Daisy Siete Season 18: Prince Charming and the Seven Maids

Other featured songs
"O, Kay Sarap" - GMA 7's Daisy Siete Season 18: Prince Charming and the Seven Maids
"Hangga't Tayo'y Magkasama" - GMA 7's Dear Friend (October 5, 2008 Episode)
"Before It's Too Late" - GMA 7's Maynila (September 27, 2008 Episode)

Awards and nominations
5x Top Booker at the Getting Married Bridal Fair Annual Awards

External links
3rd Avenue's Official Website
MTV Philippines Online Artist of the Month
3rd Avenue at SoundClick.com
https://www.theweddingvowsg.com/top-10-music-bands-wedding-reception-philippines/
https://brideandbreakfast.ph/2018/09/07/17-wedding-singers-and-bands/

Filipino pop music groups
Filipino rock music groups
Musical groups from Metro Manila
Musical groups established in 2000